Sean Gerard Joseph Stackley (born August 7, 1957) is an American engineer and former naval officer who served as the Assistant Secretary of the Navy for Research, Development and Acquisition from July 2008 to August 3, 2017. He also served as the acting Secretary of the Navy from January 20 to August 3, 2017. As of September 2018, he is SVP and President, Communications & Networked Systems Segment at  L-3 Technologies.

Early career
Prior to his appointment to ASN (RDA), Stackley served as a professional staff member of the United States Senate Committee on Armed Services. During his tenure with the committee, he was responsible for overseeing Navy and Marine Corps programs, U.S. Transportation Command matters and related policy for the Seapower Subcommittee. He also advised on Navy and Marine Corps operations and maintenance, science and technology and acquisition policy.

United States Navy career
Stackley began his U.S. Navy career as a Surface Warfare Officer (SWO), serving in engineering and combat systems assignments aboard U.S.S. John Young (DD-973). Upon completing his warfare qualifications as a SWO, he transferred from the Unrestricted Line to the Restricted Line and was designated as an Engineering Duty Officer (EDO), serving in a series of industrial, fleet, program office and headquarters assignments in ship design and construction, maintenance, logistics and acquisition policy.

From 2001 to 2005, Stackley served as the Navy's LPD 17 program manager, with responsibility for all aspects of procurement for this major ship program. Having served earlier in his career as production officer for the U.S.S. Arleigh Burke (DDG-51) class and project Naval architect overseeing structural design for the Canadian Patrol Frigate, HMCS Halifax (FFH 330), he had the unique experience of having performed a principal role in the design, construction, test and delivery of three first-of-class warships.

Stackley was commissioned and graduated with distinction from the United States Naval Academy in 1979, with a Bachelor of Science in Mechanical Engineering. He holds the degrees of Ocean Engineer and Master of Science, Mechanical Engineering from the Massachusetts Institute of Technology. Stackley earned certification as professional engineer, Commonwealth of Virginia, in 1994.

Assistant Secretary of the Navy for Research, Development and Acquisition

On May 6, 2009, Stackley said at a Sea-Air-Space Exposition luncheon that the Navy would stress continuity and affordability in acquisition.

On May 15, 2009, Stackley defended the progress on the Electromagnetic Aircraft Launch System and supported longer terms for program managers.

References

External links

|-

1957 births
George W. Bush administration personnel
Living people
Obama administration personnel
United States Assistant Secretaries of the Navy
United States Navy officers
Trump administration personnel